Youngou is a town in the Zabré Department of Boulgou Province in south-eastern Burkina Faso. In 2005, the town had a population of 6,343.

References

Populated places in the Centre-Est Region
Boulgou Province